Grand Confort is a cube-shaped high armchair, whose leather cushions are held in a chrome-plated steel corset. It was designed as a modernist response to the traditional club chair in 1928 by a team of three: Le Corbusier; his cousin and colleague Pierre Jeanneret; and Charlotte Perriand. The LC-2 and LC-3 were referred as Cusion Baskets by Le Corbusier.

Series
These chairs have become most famous:

 LC-1 - Originally titled Basculant, Fauteuil Grand Confort
 LC-2 - Petit Modèle: With a shape close to a cube, it is more narrow but has a higher seat and back. It is a small model of comfort sofa.
 LC-3 - Fauteuil grand confort, grand modèle: Wider and lower to the ground, it is a large model of comfort sofa.

In popular culture
The LC-2 (and similar LC-3) have been featured in a variety of media, notably the Maxell "blown away" advertisement.  At the 2010 Apple event, the then CEO Steve Jobs used a classic LC-3 chair while introducing the iPad.

They are a permanent design collection of the Museum of Modern Art, in New York.

In Sherlock, the modern-day BBC adaptation of Sherlock Holmes, Holmes sits in an LC-3, while Dr. Watson sits in a traditional club chair.

In Spy × Family'', the first volume depicts the character Twilight sitting in an LC-2. The Forger family's living room is also decorated with LC-2 chairs and sofa.

See also
 Le Corbusier's Furniture

References

1928 in art
Le Corbusier furniture
Chairs
Products introduced in 1928
Individual models of furniture